Denise Andrea Campbell (born 1975) is the Jamaican-Canadian executive director of social development at the City of Toronto who was also the youngest president of the National Action Committee on the Status of Women.

Early life 
Campbell was born in Jamaica in 1975 and moved to Canada in 1980.

Career 
She became the youngest president of the National Action Committee on the Status of Women in 2001, but resigned soon after when they did not pay her as the organization faced financial crisis.

Campbell is executive director of social development at the Municipal government of Toronto where she runs an $11 million program to improve responses to mental health emergencies. In 2021, she spoke of how much work was needed to tackle racism and encouraged Toronto City staff to collaborate with organizations that were already addressing problem before starting new initiatives.

Family life 
Campbell has twin boys.

References 

Living people

1975 births
Jamaican emigrants to Canada
Canadian social workers
Canadian feminists
Chairpersons of non-governmental organizations
Chairwomen